Hypena degesalis is a species of moth in the family Erebidae. It is found in North America.

The MONA or Hodges number for Hypena degesalis is 8459.

The Phylogenetic Sequence is 930582 (Pohl, et al., 2016) .

References

Further reading

 
 
 

degesalis
Articles created by Qbugbot
Moths described in 1859